The National Foundation of Museums of the Kingdom of Morocco was created in 2011. Under Law 01.09 governing this foundation, the national museums previously managed by the Ministry of Culture, were entrusted to its tutelage in February 2014.
 
Chaired by Mehdi Qotbi, The National Foundation of Museums of the Kingdom of Morocco is a non-for-profit institution invested legal personality and financial autonomy, called to strengthen the governance of the national museums it manages on behalf of the government.

Missions
The promotion of culture, as well as the strengthening, the preservation and the enhancement of the cultural and artistic Moroccan heritage  are part of the main goals of the Foundation.
The promotion of culture, as well as the strengthening, the preservation and the enhancement of the cultural and artistic Moroccan heritage  are part of the main goals of the Foundation.
 Enhance the national museums from the level of restoration of the buildings to upgrading the exhibition conditions and the existing collections ;
 Improve the administrative and financial management practices of the national museums;
 Create a platform for communication and develop supports around the content of these museums;
 Implement an acquisition program  and keep an inventory documentation of the existing collections ;
 Commit to cultural diplomacy by promoting dialogue and exchange between different countries.
Since its creation, the National Foundation of Museums of the Kingdom of Morocco has focused on implementing necessary structures and procedures to ensure proper functioning, as well as elaborating ambitious strategic planning through 2025.

Partners
The National Foundation of Museums of the Kingdom of Morocco has also signed several partnerships with prestigious international institutions. Among them, the Louvre Museum, the Museum of European and Mediterranean Civilisations (Mucem), or the Arab World Institute (IMA). These partnerships have allowed the implementation of major exhibitions, as " The splendors of Volubilis " at the Mucem, " Morocco of the thousand colours " at the IMA, and "The medieval Morocco, an empire from Africa to the Spain " at the Museum of the Louvre, take will both take place next autumn.
During a visit to New York and Washington in March 2014, the President of the Foundation had the opportunity to meet senior officials of the National Foundation of the Smithsonian, the Metropolitan Museum and the Solomon R. Guggenheim Museum. They talked about the wish of Morocco to democratize access to culture and to make it affordable to all Moroccans. All these American institutions agreed to assist in the future the Foundation in the areas of museums, the training of human resources management, and the restoration and conservation of our heritage.

References

Government of Morocco
2011 establishments in Morocco